Chris Erich Ehlers (born 22 May 1988) is a professional South African rugby union player, currently playing with the . His regular position is lock.

Career

Youth

He went to Potchefstroom-based North-West University, where he was selected in the  squad that played in the 2007 Under-19 Provincial Championship.

Falcons

He made another start and played off the bench in their other five matches as they disappointingly finished bottom of the log, losing all seven of their matches.

He started seven of their eight matches in the 2011 Vodacom Cup competition, coming on as a reserve in the other as they finished sixth in the Northern Section of the competition. He also played a bigger part in the 2011 Currie Cup First Division than in 2010, starting six matches and appearing as a substitute on two further occasions.

Griffons

He featured in all six of their matches in the 2012 Vodacom Cup competition, but his side once again finished bottom of the log with just one victory. Ehlers finished on the losing side of a semi-final for the second year in a row as the  won 37–30 in Nelspruit. He also picked up an injury in the semi-final match which ruled him out of the entire 2013 Vodacom Cup.

He returned to action in the 2013 Currie Cup First Division, playing in all fourteen of the Griffons' matches and starting thirteen of those. Ehlers won a personal accolade, being crowned the Griffons' Currie Cup Forward of the Year and was also named in the ' wider training group prior to the 2014 Super Rugby season, but missed out on the final squad.

A knee injury ruled Ehlers out of the entire 2014 Vodacom Cup, as well as the 2014 Currie Cup qualification series.

He retired in 2015 after a persistent knee injury kept him on the sidelines.

References

South African rugby union players
Living people
1988 births
People from Kroonstad
Rugby union locks
Falcons (rugby union) players
Griffons (rugby union) players
Rugby union players from the Free State (province)